The name Bryza is associated with:

 Matthew Bryza - a United States diplomat
 PZL M28B Bryza - a Polish STOL light maritime patrol, cargo and passenger plane